In finance, a chooser option is a special type of option contract. It gives the purchaser a fixed period to decide whether the derivative will be a European call or put option.

In more detail, a chooser option has a specified decision time , where the buyer has to make the decision described above. Finally, at the expiration time  the option expires.

Replication 
For stocks without dividend, the chooser option can be replicated using one call option with strike price  and expiration time , and one put option with strike price  and expiration time ;.

References

Bibliography 
 Yue-Kuen Kwok, Compound options (from Derivatives Week and Encyclopedia of Financial Engineering and Risk Management) 

Options (finance)